Oribe Peralta Morones (born 12 January 1984) is a Mexican former professional footballer who played as a forward. He is an Olympic gold medalist.

Peralta began his professional career with Morelia in 2003. He later played for León and Monterrey in 2004 and 2006. Peralta was then sold to Santos Laguna, then loaned out to Chiapas in 2008. After he returned from loan, Peralta was a mainstay with Santos Laguna for the next five years, playing in over 200 matches and scoring over 80 goals.

Peralta made his senior international debut in 2005, though he did not receive call-ups consistently until 2011, being one of the over-aged reinforcements who won the 2011 Pan American Games with the under-22 squad. He scored two goals in the gold medal match at the 2012 Olympic football tournament against Brazil, which was the first Olympic gold medal for Mexico in football. He also participated in the 2015 CONCACAF Gold Cup, Copa America Centenario, 2017 FIFA Confederations Cup, the 2014, and 2018 FIFA World Cup. He retired from the national team following the 2018 World Cup.

Early life
Peralta was born in a small town of La Partida, near Torreón, Coahuila, to Miguel Ángel Peralta and Julieta Morones, and was the oldest of four brothers.

At the age of 13, Peralta joined his first football team Los Vagos from his home town. In 1998, when he was in high school, he made the official town team of La Partida to play against other Municipalities in Torreon. He managed to join CESIFUT (Centro de Sinergia Futbolista) [Synergy Center of Football] after having recovered from a broken tibia and fibula which left him immobile for a year. After months of recuperation, Peralta managed to get into Alacranes de Durango, a professional team in the Liga Premier de México and drew the attention of C.D. Guadalajara's head coach Oscar Ruggeri, who took him to Guadalajara for a trial. He would then receive an invitation from Monarcas Morelia, where manager Rubén Omar Romano gave him a try out with the team in which he debuted.

Club career

Morelia
A native of Torreón, Oribe Peralta made his league debut for Monarcas Morelia on 22 February 2003, coming in as a substitute in the second half of a league match against Club América, which ended in a 1–2 defeat. Peralta then played his second match of his first season against Cruz Azul. For the next two seasons Peralta did not see any action, and was transferred to León of the second division. He made 33 appearances and scored ten goals, winning the Clausura tournament with the club in 2004.

Monterrey
After playing for León, Peralta joined Monterrey to play with them for the next two seasons. Peralta made his debut for Monterrey against UANL in the second half as a substitute in the 2–6 defeat. In his second match, he scored his first goal of his career in the first division after coming in as a substitute, scoring the second goal of the match against Cruz Azul, with Monterrey going on to win the match 3–0. Peralta ended his first season with five goals in 22 matches and making it to the final. Monterrey would go on to lose against UNAM.

Peralta then started his second season at the club as a substitute. For the next four matches, he was used as a substitute until he made his second start against Puebla, scoring his second goal of the season. He ended the season with four goals. For the next two seasons, Peralta received less playing time, only managing to score two goals in 22 matches.

Guadalajara (loan)
In 2005, Monterrey loaned Peralta to Guadalajara as a reinforcement for the 2005 Copa Libertadores tournament. He only played in four matches and did not score any goals.

Santos Laguna
In 2006, Peralta moved to Santos Laguna. He made his debut against Monterrey - his former club - scoring his first goal in his first start of the season. Peralta ended the season with 9 goals in 17 matches and 7 assists.

Chiapas (loan)
In 2009, Peralta was loaned out on a one-year deal to Jaguares for the Clausura tournament. He had a successful loan spell with Jaguares, scoring 12 goals in 35 appearances.

Return to Santos Laguna

After his successful loan spell, Peralta returned to Santos Laguna in 2010. He was Santos Laguna's main striker and went on to score 82 goals in 225 games during his time with the club, as well as winning the Clausura 2008 and 2012 championships. Peralta also helped Santos reach the finals of the CONCACAF Champions League on two occasions within two years. He was also awarded the CONCACAF Player of the Year in 2013 for his excellent performance.  Peralta was the top scorer of the 2011–12 CONCACAF Champions League with a total of 7 goals in 8 games helping his team reach the finals against Monterrey, which they lost. On 26 April 2014, he scored his last goal with Santos scoring the second goal for Santos giving them the 2–1 lead against Veracruz. The match ended in a 2–2 draw.

On 10 May 2014, Peralta played his final game for Santos Laguna at home in Estadio Corona in a 4–2 win against Pachuca.

América
On 13 May 2014, it was announced that Peralta was sold to Club América prior to the Apertura tournament. Though details of the transfer were undisclosed, it was reported that América paid US$10 million for Peralta, making his transfer the most expensive in Mexican football history at the time, as well as receiving an annual salary of US$2.5 million.

Peralta made his league debut on 19 July, assisting in Osvaldo Martínez's first goal in América's 2–1 win over León. On 2 August, Peralta scored his first goal for América in the 4–0 victory over Puebla at the Estadio Cuauhtémoc. On 14 December, Peralta won the league title with América after defeating Tigres UANL 3–1 on aggregate in the final, coming back from a 0–1 first-leg loss to win 3–0 in the second-leg, with Peralta scoring the third and final goal.

On 23 July 2016, in the second game of the Apertura tournament, Peralta scored his first hat-trick for America in a 3–1 victory over Toluca. On 10 September, Peralta returned to América after suffering an injury at the Summer Olympics against Cruz Azul, scoring the first goal for América as they came back from a 0–3 deficit to win the match 4–3.

Prior to the start of the 2017 Clausura tournament, Peralta was named team captain following the departures of Rubens Sambueza and Moisés Muñoz, who had both acted as captain and vice-captain, respectively. He was the club's top goal scorer of the tournament with eight goals, though América failed to qualify for the playoffs.

On 15 September 2017, Peralta scored his 50th league goal with Club América in their 1–1 draw against Tijuana.

On 26 May 2018, Oribe Peralta won his second Liga MX title with Club América defeating Cruz Azul in the final with a 2–0 win at the Estadio Azteca.

Return to Guadalajara
After his brief loan spell with Guadalajara in 2005, Peralta returned to Guadalajara in 2019, after the team signed the veteran forward from rival Club América, generating controversy. The 35-year-old agreed to a two-year contract with Guadalajara, with the possibility of an extension for a third year. On 1 October, in a Copa MX match against Correcaminos UAT, he would score his first goal after a year-long drought, winning the match 2–0. On 31 January 2020, Peralta scored what would become his final goal as a professional football player in a 2–2 draw against Atlético San Luis.

Retirement

On 12 January 2022, Peralta announced his retirement from professional football.

International career

Youth

2011 Pan American Games
In 2011, Peralta was selected by coach Luis Fernando Tena as one of three over-aged reinforcements for the 2011 Pan American Games. Mexico won the gold medal with Peralta finishing as the tournament's top scorer with six goals. At the start of the tournament, Peralta scored his first goal in a 2–1 win against Ecuador on 19 October. Two days later, he scored a goal in the match against Trinidad and Tobago, which ended in a 1–1 draw. In the third match against Uruguay on 23 October, Peralta scored a goal in Mexico's 5–2 win. Peralta scored a hat-trick against Costa Rica to make it to the final against Argentina in which Mexico won with a score of 1–0.

2012 Summer Olympics
Coach Luis Fernando Tena again called-up Peralta as one of the three overage players for the 2012 Summer Olympics in London. Peralta participated in all of Mexico's matches, playing a vital role in the semi-final match against Japan by scoring in the 65th minute of the game to go up 2–1, with Mexico winning the match 3–1 and advancing to the final. In the gold-medal match against Brazil, Peralta scored in the first 29 seconds of the game, being assisted by Javier Aquino, making it the fastest goal of the Olympics and in any FIFA tournament final. Peralta scored the second goal in the 75th minute, assisted by a Marco Fabian free-kick. Mexico won the match 2–1. In total, Peralta made six appearances and was the tournament's third-best goalscorer, and Mexico's top-scorer with four goals in 529 minutes played.

2016 Summer Olympics
On 7 July 2016, Peralta was confirmed as one of the three overage players to participate in the 2016 Summer Olympics in Rio de Janeiro, Brazil. Peralta was named captain and scored the first goal in Mexico's 2–2 draw against Germany in the opening match of Group C on 4 August. On 7 August, it was announced that Peralta was ruled out of the national squad after sustaining a fractured nose during Mexico's match against Fiji.

Senior
Peralta made his debut for Mexico coming on as a late substitute during a friendly match against Argentina on 9 March 2005. He was included in the preparations for the 2006 World Cup but did not make the final squad.

Peralta was called up by coach Luis Fernando Tena as one of the five over-aged reinforcements of the Mexican team composed entirely of players under the age of 22 that participated in the 2011 Copa América, though he had a limited role as a reserve.

On 10 August 2011, Peralta officially made his return to the national team after six years and scored his first goal for Mexico against the United States in a match that ended in a 1–1 draw. He did not participate in the 2013 FIFA Confederations Cup or the 2013 CONCACAF Gold Cup due to injury.

On 8 May 2014, Peralta was selected for the final 23-man roster participating in the 2014 FIFA World Cup by coach Miguel Herrera. He scored the only goal in Mexico's debut match in Natal against Cameroon on 13 June, pouncing on the rebound after goalkeeper Charles Itandje parried Giovani dos Santos' shot after 61 minutes.

On 9 July 2015, Peralta scored a hat-trick during Mexico's opening match of the 2015 CONCACAF Gold Cup – a 6–0 defeat of Cuba in Chicago; he also scored in the Final, a 3–1 win against Jamaica in Philadelphia.

After being included in Mexico's preliminary squad for the 2018 FIFA World Cup, Peralta announced that he would retire from the national team after the competition. He was named in the final 23-man roster on 4 June.

Style of play
Described as a late bloomer, he is able to shoot from within or outside of the box, has superb aerial game, and is capable of providing passes.

Personal life
Peralta is known to be a devout Catholic.

Sponsorship
Peralta is currently sponsored by German sportswear manufacturer Puma, appearing in various adverts for the company, including the presentation of the new line of boots that would be used during the 2014 FIFA World Cup.

Career statistics

Club

International

Scores and results list Mexico's goal tally first, score column indicates score after each Peralta goal. Includes one unofficial goal.

Honours
León
Primera División A: Clausura 2004

Santos Laguna
Mexican Primera División: Clausura 2008, Clausura 2012

América
Liga MX: Apertura 2014, Apertura 2018
Copa MX: Clausura 2019
CONCACAF Champions League: 2014–15, 2015–16

Mexico Olympic
Pan American Games: 2011
Olympic Gold Medal: 2012

Mexico
CONCACAF Gold Cup: 2015
CONCACAF Cup: 2015

Individual
Pan American Games Golden Boot: 2011
Mexican Primera División Forward of the Tournament: Apertura 2011, Clausura 2012
Mexican Primera División Golden Ball: Clausura 2012
CONCACAF Champions League Golden Ball: 2011–12
CONCACAF Champions League Golden Boot: 2011–12, 2014–15
CONCACAF Player of the Year: 2013

References

External links

 
 
 Oribe Peralta at ESPN Deportes 
 
 
 
 

1984 births
Living people
Footballers from Coahuila
Mexico international footballers
Mexican Roman Catholics
Atlético Morelia players
Club León footballers
C.F. Monterrey players
Santos Laguna footballers
Chiapas F.C. footballers
Club América footballers
Liga MX players
Association football forwards
Sportspeople from Torreón
Olympic footballers of Mexico
Footballers at the 2011 Pan American Games
2011 Copa América players
Footballers at the 2012 Summer Olympics
2014 FIFA World Cup players
2015 CONCACAF Gold Cup players
Footballers at the 2016 Summer Olympics
Copa América Centenario players
2017 FIFA Confederations Cup players
Olympic gold medalists for Mexico
Olympic medalists in football
Medalists at the 2012 Summer Olympics
CONCACAF Gold Cup-winning players
Pan American Games gold medalists for Mexico
Pan American Games medalists in football
Mexican footballers
2018 FIFA World Cup players
Medalists at the 2011 Pan American Games